Karajan, or Caragiani, Karagianni, Karayiannis, Karagianis, is a Greek surname. This last name, like several other Ottoman-era ones, contains the Turkish language prefix 'kara' in reference to someone's dark complexion.

Notable persons with that surname include:
 Eftychia Karagianni, Greek water polo player
 Georgios Karayiannis, Greek Army officer
 Herbert von Karajan (1908–1989), Austrian conductor, great-grandson of Theodor von Karajan
 Ioan D. Caragiani, Romanian folklorist
 Martha Karagianni, Greek actress
 Maurine Karagianis, Canadian politician
 Pete Karagianis, American chess player
 Vaios Karagiannis (born 1968), Greek football player
 Peter Karrie, (Full name Peter Karagianis), Welsh Singer & TV show host